Ilham Mammadov (born 1 January 1970, Qaza Ray, Azerbaijan SSR) is an Azerbaijani retired international footballer and manager. He played most of his career as an attacking midfielder for FK Göyazan Qazax, Turan Tovuz and VfB Fichte Bielefeld.

Career statistics

References

External links
 

Living people
1970 births
People from Qazax
Azerbaijani footballers
Association football midfielders
Azerbaijan international footballers
Turan-Tovuz IK players
SV Eintracht Trier 05 players
FSV Salmrohr players
TuS Dornberg players
Azerbaijani football managers
Neftçi PFK managers
Azerbaijani expatriate footballers
Azerbaijani expatriate football managers
Azerbaijani expatriate sportspeople in Germany
Expatriate footballers in Germany